Merrittstown is an unincorporated community in Fayette County, Pennsylvania, United States. Merrittstown has a post office, with ZIP code 15463.

References

Unincorporated communities in Fayette County, Pennsylvania
Unincorporated communities in Pennsylvania